Thatched Cottages and Houses is an oil painting by Vincent van Gogh that he painted in May 1890 when he lived in Auvers-sur-Oise, France.

Van Gogh spent the last few months of his life in Auvers-sur-Oise, a small town just north of Paris, after he left the asylum in Saint-Rémy in May 1890.

Thatched Cottages and Houses is thought to be the study he mentions in his letter of 21 May 1890 to his brother Theo and wife Jo immediately after arriving in Auvers:"... when I wrote to you I hadn’t yet done anything. Now I have a study of old thatched roofs with a field of peas in flower and some wheat in the foreground, hilly background. A study which I think you’ll like."

Hulsker believes the painting is amongst a group of 20 or so works executed by Vincent immediately after his arrival in Auvers, May 20, and the remainder of the month:" ... we immediately see in this painting the bright colours that, generally speaking, are characteristic of the Auvers period and differentiate them somewhat from the paintings done in Saint-Rémy - although there is naturally no question of a real break with the past from one week to the next."

The painting is in the collection of the State Hermitage Museum, St. Petersburg.

See Van Gogh, Artistic breakthrough and final years, Auves-sur-Oise

See also
Cottages series
Houses at Auvers
Impressionism
List of works by Vincent van Gogh  
Postimpressionism
Saint-Paul Asylum, Saint-Remy series.

References

External links

1890 paintings
Paintings by Vincent van Gogh
Paintings of Auvers-sur-Oise by Vincent van Gogh
Paintings in the collection of the Hermitage Museum